The chestnut-breasted nigrita (Nigrita bicolor) is a common species of estrildid finch found in Africa. It has an estimated global extent of occurrence of 3,000,000 km2.

Habitat

The chestnut-breasted nigrita inhabits subtropical/ tropical (lowland) forest, mangrove and shrubland habitats of the African tropical rainforest.

The status of the species is evaluated as Least Concern.

References

BirdLife Species Factsheet

chestnut-breasted nigrita
chestnut-breasted nigrita